Bernburg-Friedenshall station is a railway station in the Friedenshall district in the municipality of Bernburg, located in the Salzlandkreis district in Saxony-Anhalt, Germany.

References

Railway stations in Saxony-Anhalt
Buildings and structures in Salzlandkreis
Railway stations in Germany opened in 1897
1897 establishments in Prussia